Friends for Life is the seventh studio album by Jamaican recording artist Buju Banton. It was released on March 11, 2003 through VP Music Group with exclusive distribution via Atlantic Records. Production was primarily handled by Donovan Germain and Buju Banton, along with Cool & Dre, Jammy "Jamz" James, Sheldon Stewart, Sly Dunbar, Steely & Clevie, Steven "Lenky" Marsden. It features guest appearances from Beres Hammond, Bounty Killer, Fat Joe, Nadine Sutherland, Sons & Daughters Choir and Wayne Wonder. The album peaked at number 198 on the US Billboard 200 album chart, and was nominated for Grammy Award for Best Reggae Album at the 46th Annual Grammy Awards, but lost to Sean Paul's Dutty Rock. The album was supported with charted single "Paid Not Played", which peaked at number 84 on the Official Singles Chart Top 100 in the UK.

Critical reception 

Rick Anderson of AllMusic said that "This is not his best album by a long shot, but it does demonstrate his clear superiority to most of the dancehall pack". Dave Simpson, reviewer of The Guardian, saw the album as the biggest escalation of his positive side of music, saying: "Since 1995's well-regarded 'Til Shiloh, he has become known as Mr Positivity, and this album is the upper and worst example of that trite and withdrawn imagery", ending the review saying: "after a strong and rousing beginnings, Friends for Life gets lost in slush".

Track listing

Charts

References

External links

2003 albums
Buju Banton albums
Albums produced by Cool & Dre
Albums produced by Donovan Germain
Albums produced by Steely & Clevie